Pantaivka is an urban-type settlement in Oleksandriia Raion of Kirovohrad Oblast in Ukraine. Pantaivka hosts the administration of  Pantaivka settlement hromada, one of the hromadas of Ukraine. Population: 

Until 18 July 2020, Pantaivka belonged to Oleksandriia Municipality. The municipality was abolished as an administrative unit in July 2020 as part of the administrative reform of Ukraine, which reduced the number of raions of Kirovohrad Oblast to four. The area of Oleksandriia Municipality was merged into Oleksandriia Raion.

Economy

Transportation
Pantaivka railway station is on the railway which connects Oleksandriia and Znamianka with further connections to Kropyvnytskyi and Kremenchuk. There is infrequent passenger traffic.

Highway M30 (formerly M04) which connects Kropyvnytskyi with Dnipro runs through Pantaivka.

References

Urban-type settlements in Oleksandriia Raion